Trond-Arne Bredesen (born 4 February 1967 in Gran) is a Norwegian nordic combined from 1986 to 1991, representing Gran IL in Hadeland. He won four medals at the FIS Nordic World Ski Championships with one gold (3 x 10 km team: 1989), two silvers (15 km individual and 3 x 10 km team: both 1987), and one bronze (15 km individual: 1989). Bredesen finished third originally in the 15 km individual event at the 1987 championships, but moved up to second following the doping disqualification of American Kerry Lynch.

He competed at the 1988 Winter Olympics in Calgary, finishing 11th in the 15 km individual event. Bredesen also earned his only individual career victories during the 1988-89 season (four total), giving him the overall World Cup championship that season.

External links

1967 births
Living people
People from Gran, Norway
Norwegian male Nordic combined skiers
Olympic Nordic combined skiers of Norway
Nordic combined skiers at the 1988 Winter Olympics
FIS Nordic Combined World Cup winners
FIS Nordic World Ski Championships medalists in Nordic combined
Sportspeople from Innlandet
20th-century Norwegian people